The 1995–96 All-Ireland Senior Club Hurling Championship was the 26th staging of the All-Ireland Senior Club Hurling Championship, the Gaelic Athletic Association's premier inter-county club hurling tournament. The championship began on 30 September 1995 and ended on 17 March 1996.

Birr of Offaly were the defending champions, however, they failed to qualify after being defeated in the Offaly Senior Championship.

On 17 March 1996, Sixmilebridge won the championship after a 5–10 to 2–06 defeat of Dunloy in the All-Ireland final at Croke Park. It remains their only championship title.

Sixmilebridge's Gerry McInerney was the championship's top scorer with 5–15.

Results

Connacht Senior Club Hurling Championship

First round

Quarter-final

Semi-finals

Final

Leinster Senior Club Hurling Championship

Preliminary round

First round

Quarter-finals

Semi-finals

Final

Munster Senior Club Hurling Championship

Quarter-finals

Semi-finals

Final

Ulster Senior Club Hurling Championship

Semi-finals

Final

All-Ireland Senior Club Hurling Championship

Quarter-final

Semi-finals

Final

Championship statistics

Top scorers

Top scorers overall

Top scorers in a single game

References

1995 in hurling
1996 in hurling
All-Ireland Senior Club Hurling Championship